Recoil is a Boomerang roller coaster located at Wonderla in Hyderabad, India. It was previously located at Alabama Adventure as Zoomerang until new management in 2012 decided to remove its rides and solely operate as a water park called "Splash Adventure". It also operated at Wonderland Sydney as The Demon after being relocated from World Expo Park. The ride was removed in  2013 and sold to Wonderla in India where it was renamed "Recoil".

History
It originally opened in 1988 as Titan at World Expo Park in Brisbane, Australia. It closed after only one season before opening as Demon in 1992 at Wonderland in Sydney. It operated until the park closed in April 2004, where it then was relocated to Alabama Adventure.

Following the 2004 season, Southland Entertainment Group announced that VisionLand would introduce a new steel coaster for the 2005 season. Originally slated for inclusion for the 2006 season, its opening was moved up due to demand and improved attendance numbers. The name Zoomerang was announced in February 2005 and was chosen from a field of over 6,500 suggestions in a name the ride contest. The ride officially opened on May 8, 2005.

Ride
It goes through three inversions then goes up a second chain lift. The train is released and travels the course in reverse.

Train
The train was built by German company Sunkid Heege GmbH and features 7 cars, seating 4 per car (28 total). When it was Zoomerang at Alabama Adventure, it used a train manufactured by Arrow Dynamics.

See also
 2011 in amusement parks

References

External links
 Pictures of the titan being constructed at World Expo Park
 Pictures of the Demon being reconstructed at Australia's Wonderland
 Pictures of the Demon in operation at Australia's Wonderland Sydney
 Videos of the Demon in operation at Australia's Wonderland Sydney
 Pictures of the Demon being removed from Wonderland Sydney
 The Zoomerang being constructed at Alabama Adventure

Former roller coasters in Alabama
Boomerang roller coasters
Roller coasters in India
The Demon